NYC Busker Ball is an event conceived and organized by busker, musician and artist Theo Eastwind, an active subway performer. His first NYC Busker Ball, which took place on January 23, 2013, was staged at a nightclub called Spike Hill in Brooklyn, NY, and was organized as a charity event to raise money to be donated to the American Red Cross to assist in their effort to aid those suffering in the aftermath of Hurricane Sandy.

Eastwind issued a call to action to other street performers he knew at the time to join him and be part of the benefit that night. This first NYC Busker Ball was very well attended by members of the local community. He and the others entertained those in attendance for over five hours with their music. The proceeds from their performances were then donated as planned to the relief effort.

After the successful reception of the initial event a decision was made to continue the NYC Busker Ball series on a quarterly basis. Artists who are featured at these concerts still consist of entertainers who utilize public spaces as their stage. The concept has now spread to other cities around the world and they are usually hosted by other local buskers and street performers in the venue's surrounding area.

A portion of the proceeds from the NYC Busker Ball now go toward educating other musicians in the art of busking, especially about the protection provided by the First Amendment to the United States Constitution such as the freedom of speech, right of assembly, and freedom of association, and how that relates to the ability of an artist to perform on publicly owned property.

List of Events

References

Ralph White. July 17, 2014. Sounds From the Underground Surface at NYC Busker Ball VII in Brooklyn. Hot Indie News.
Byron Bennett. July 21, 2014. Hot Nights in the City at A Cool Concert – The NYC Busker Ball VII. BuzzNet. 
Gali Brock. July 21, 2014. A Spectacular Subway Series: NYC Busker Ball VII. HubPages.
DJ Knix. July 18, 2014. Busker Ball VII on July 24. The Knix Mix.
DJ Knix. July 18, 2014. Interview with the Performers of the NYC Busker Ball VII. WERU Community Radio 89.9 FM ~ 99.9 FM.  
Rew Starr. July 2, 2014. Interview with Theo Eastwind. The *Rew & Who Show. 
Music Industry News Network. June 30, 2014. Get Ready To Celebrate National Busker Ball Day on July 24.
Byron Bennett. October 6, 2014. The Rules of Engagement. BuzzNet.

External links
NYC Busker Ball

Events in New York City